Montroy may refer to:

 Montroy, Charente-Maritime, a commune in France
 Montroy, Valencia, a municipality in Spain